Silvia Ciornei (born 27 August 1970 in Bucharest) is a Romanian politician and Member of the European Parliament. She is a member of the Conservative Party, part of the Alliance of Liberals and Democrats for Europe, and became an MEP on 1 January 2007 with the accession of Romania to the European Union.

External links
European Parliament profile
European Parliament official photo

1970 births
Living people
Politicians from Bucharest
21st-century Romanian women politicians
Conservative Party (Romania) politicians
Conservative Party (Romania) MEPs
MEPs for Romania 2007
Women MEPs for Romania
21st-century Romanian politicians